Qońirat, also spelled as Kungrad (Karakalpak: Қоңырат, Qońirat), formerly known as Zheleznodorozhny (until 1969), is a city in Karakalpakstan, Uzbekistan, located in the Amu Darya delta on the left bank of the river. It is the seat of Qońirat district. Its population is 37,100 (2016).

References

External links 
Kungrad, Uzbekistan - history, photos and map

Populated places in Karakalpakstan
Cities in Uzbekistan